Grande Prairie-Smoky was a provincial electoral district in Alberta, Canada, mandated to return a single member to the Legislative Assembly of Alberta using first-past-the-post balloting from 1993 to 2019.

The riding was created in 1993 when from the Smoky River electoral district was expanded into the old Whitecourt electoral district. The district includes the north portion of the city of Grande Prairie as well as the towns of Fox Creek, Sexsmith and Valleyview.

History
The electoral district was created in the 1993 boundary redistribution from the electoral district of Smoky River and Whitecourt. It remained mostly unchanged in the 1997 and 2003 electoral boundary re-distributions. The Boundaries Commission proposed to abolish the district to create a completely urban Grande Prairie district but it changed its decision under public pressure. The 2010 re-distribution made minor changes to the border with Grande Prairie-Wapiti in the city of Grande Prairie but stayed the same in the rural areas.

Boundary history

Representation history

The electoral district was created in the 1993 boundary redistribution primarily from the old Smoky River and Whitecourt riding's. The first election held that year saw Progressive Conservative Smoky River incumbent Walter Paszkowski win a comfortable majority to pick up the seat for his party. He ran for a second term winning a larger majority in the 1997 election. He retired from the legislature at dissolution in 2001.

The former representative was Progressive Conservative Mel Knight who won his first election in 2001 with a massive majority taking 67% of the popular vote. He was re-elected to his second term in the 2004 election with a very large, but reduced majority.

Premier Ed Stelmach appointed Mel Knight as Minister of Energy in 2006. He won a slightly higher majority running for a third term in the 2008 general election. Knight was shuffled out of the Energy portfolio in 2010 and then served as the Minister of Sustainable Resource Development.

Upon his retirement, Everett McDonald kept the seat for the PCs at a reduced vote share in the 2012 election. In 2015, however, third-time candidate Todd Loewen finally captured the seat for Wildrose. He subsequently crossed the floor to the United Conservative Party when the two parties merged.

Election results

1993 general election

1997 general election

2001 general election

2004 general election

2008 general election

2012 general election

2015 general election

Senate nominee results

2004 Senate nominee election district results

Voters had the option of selecting 4 Candidates on the Ballot

2012 Senate nominee election district results

Student Vote results

2004 election

On November 19, 2004 a Student Vote was conducted at participating Alberta schools to parallel the 2004 Alberta general election results. The vote was designed to educate students and simulate the electoral process for persons who have not yet reached the legal majority. The vote was conducted in 80 of the 83 provincial electoral districts with students voting for actual election candidates. Schools with a large student body that reside in another electoral district had the option to vote for candidates outside of the electoral district then where they were physically located.

2012 election

References

Further reading

External links
Elections Alberta
The Legislative Assembly of Alberta

Former provincial electoral districts of Alberta
Grande Prairie